Aq Chay (also Romanized as Āq Chāy; also known as Agh Chay and Āq Chāq) is a village in Kharqan Rural District, in the Central District of Razan County, Hamadan Province, Iran. At the 2006 census, its population was 337, in 59 families.

References 

Populated places in Razan County